Ahmadiyya Muslim Jama'at or Ahmadiyya Muslim Community, 
 Academy of Management Journal, a peer-reviewed academic journal of management, published by the Academy of Management